is a Prefectural Natural Park in western Hokkaidō, Japan. Established in 1968, the park spans the municipalities of Ebetsu, Kitahiroshima, and Sapporo.

The park is home of a number of attractions such as, the Hokkaido Centennial Memorial Tower, the Historical Museum of Hokkaido and the Historical Village of Hokkaido; covering the culture, history and lifestyle of Hokkaido.

Overview

The park has more than 510 plant species, including 110 tree species, as well as more than 200 species of mushrooms, 140 species of birds and 1,300 species of insects. Yezo squirrels, Japanese hares, Yezo brown frogs, Hokkaido salamanders and other animals inhabit the park.

The biggest symbol of the park is the Centennial Memorial Tower located near the western entrance. The tower was built in commemoration of the Hokkaidō Centenary, in September, 1970.  The height of the tower is 100 m, and includes a view room located at a height of 23.5 m inside the tower.
However tower is will be demolition On May 2024 due to high cost for me tenace the tower.

The Historical Museum of Hokkaido, located inside the Park, details Hokkaido’s development from prehistoric to modern times, the section on the indigenous Ainu has displays of clothing, a house, items used for trade with the Japanese and other artifacts, along with descriptions of their forced assimilation into Japanese culture. Another section is about Hokkaido’s early contacts with
Russia, the lives of 19th-century Japanese pioneers, the opening of Hakodate Port, the establishment of Sapporo Agricultural College, and more. Finally, the Living Experience Room, provides many interactive displays.

The Historical Village of Hokkaido. also located inside the Park, is an open-air museum with more than 50 historical Japanese and Western-style buildings, dating mostly from the Meiji  and Taisho periods, and brought here from different locations in the Hokkaido Prefecture.

The Shizen Fureai Kan, a nature center, located at the north side of the park, provides information about the nature in the park.

Access 
JR Hokkaido: 20 minutes walking distance from Shinrin-Kōen Station.
JR Bus: 15 minutes from Shin-Sapporo Station (JR Hokkaido & Sapporo Subway) to Nopporo Shinrin Koen Bus stop.

See also
 National Parks of Japan

References

External links 
  Map of Natural Parks of Hokkaidō
  Map of Nopporo Shinrin Kōen Prefectural Natural Park

Parks and gardens in Sapporo
Protected areas established in 1968
1968 establishments in Japan